The Party of Christian Democrats (PChD) was a political party in Poland.

History
The PChD was established in Poznań on 16 December 1990, by former activists from the Solidarity trade union. Its founding congress was held on 13 January 1991, with Krzysztof Pawłowski becoming party chairman and Paweł Łączkowski being appointed secretary general. In the 1991 parliamentary elections it won four seats in the Sejm and three in the Senate.

The party joined the Catholic Electoral Committee "Homeland" for the 1993 elections, but the alliance failed to win a seat. It joined the Solidarity Electoral Action (AWS) alliance in 1996. The AWS went on to win the 1997 elections, with PChD taking seven of its 201 seats. .

In July 1999, an agreement was reached with the leaders of the Centre Agreement and the Movement for the Republic to merge to form a new party. The Polish Christian Democrat Agreement was subsequently established on 26 September.

List of MPs

References

Defunct political parties in Poland
Political parties established in 1990
Political parties disestablished in 1999
1990 establishments in Poland
1999 disestablishments in Poland